John Panton, MBE (9 October 1916 – 24 July 2009) was a Scottish professional golfer, who represented Great Britain three times in the Ryder Cup.

Panton was born in Pitlochry. He turned professional in 1935 and took up a job in the local golf club shop. After serving in the army during World War II, he went on to win many prestigious tournaments including the 1956 PGA Match Play Championship, the 1950 Silver King Tournament, the 1951 Daks Tournament and the 1952 North British-Harrogate Tournament. He also won the Woodlawn Invitation Open in Germany for three consecutive years from 1958. In Scotland, he dominated, with eight victories in the Scottish Professionals Championship and seven in the Northern Open between 1948 and 1966.

In addition to tournament golf, Panton also served as a club professional at Glenbervie Golf Club until 1984. Later in his career, he won the PGA Seniors Championship twice, in 1967 and 1969, and the World Senior Championship in 1967, defeating Sam Snead 3 and 2 in the final.

Panton was appointed honorary professional to The Royal and Ancient Golf Club of St Andrews in 1988, a position he held until his retirement in 2006. In 2005, he was made an honorary life member of the European Tour.

As well as his Ryder Cup appearances in 1951, 1953 and 1961, Panton also represented Scotland 13 times in the World Cup between 1955 and 1968.

Panton's daughter, Catherine Panton-Lewis, is a professional golfer and was a founding member of the Ladies European Tour.

Beverage
In common with Arnold Palmer, Panton had a beverage named after him in his home country. A John Panton is a drink consisting of angostura bitters, ginger beer mixed with a dash of lime cordial.

Professional wins
This list is incomplete
1948 Northern Open, Scottish Professional Championship
1949 Scottish Professional Championship
1950 Silver King Tournament, Scottish Professional Championship
1951 Daks Tournament, Northern Open, Scottish Professional Championship
1952 North British-Harrogate Tournament, Northern Open, Goodwin (Sheffield) Foursomes Tournament (with Norman Roffe)
1954 Scottish Professional Championship, Yorkshire Evening News Tournament
1955 Scottish Professional Championship
1956 News of the World Match Play, Northern Open, Gleneagles-Saxone Foursomes Tournament (with W Alexander)
1958 Woodlawn Invitation Open
1959 Woodlawn Invitation Open, Northern Open, Scottish Professional Championship
1960 Woodlawn Invitation Open, Northern Open
1962 Northern Open
1964 Cutty Sark Tournament
1965 Cutty Sark Tournament
1966 Scottish Professional Championship (tied with Eric Brown)
1967 PGA Seniors Championship, World Senior Championship, Cutty Sark Tournament
1968 Scottish Coca-Cola Tournament
1969 PGA Seniors Championship
1971 Scottish Coca-Cola Tournament

Results in major championships

Note: Panton only played in The Open Championship.

NT = No tournament
CUT = missed the half-way cut (3rd round cut in 1972 Open Championship)
"T" indicates a tie for a place

Team appearances
Ryder Cup (representing Great Britain): 1951, 1953, 1961
World Cup (representing Scotland): 1955, 1956, 1957, 1958, 1959, 1960, 1961, 1962, 1963, 1964, 1965, 1966, 1968
Joy Cup (representing the British Isles): 1954 (winners), 1956 (winners)
Amateurs–Professionals Match (representing the Professionals): 1956 (winners)
R.T.V. International Trophy (representing Scotland): 1967 (captain)

References

External links

Scottish male golfers
European Tour golfers
Ryder Cup competitors for Europe
Members of the Order of the British Empire
British Army personnel of World War II
People from Perth and Kinross
1916 births
2009 deaths